Kubinyi is a surname of Hungarian origin. Notable persons with the surname include:

 Agoston Kubinyi (1799–1873), nobleman and first director of the Hungarian National Museum
 Eniko Kubinyi (born 1976), Hungarian biologist
 Frigyes Kubinyi (1909–1948), Hungarian boxer
 Kálmán Kubinyi (1906–1973), American artist

Surnames of Hungarian origin